Yun Yea-ji (also Yoon Yea-ji; born November 30, 1994) is a South Korean figure skater. She is the 2008 South Korean Junior champion and competed at two Four Continents Championships. Her best result was 12th at the 2011 Four Continents.

Personal life
Yun Yea-ji was born on November 30, 1994, in Seoul, South Korea.

Career

Early career
Early in her career, Yun performed in shows in South Korea, including Festa On Ice, a show headlined by Kim Yuna. Kim recommended Yun to her choreographer, David Wilson, and Wilson choreographed Yun's programs for the 2008–09 season. Yun also went to Toronto, Ontario, Canada for two months in the summer of 2008 and trained under Brian Orser, Kim's former coach.

She won the 2007 South Korean Novice National Championships. She did not compete internationally on the junior level in the 2007–08 season because she was not yet age-eligible. After her win at the 2008 South Korean Junior Championships, she was sent to the 2008 Triglav Trophy, where she won the event on the novice level.

2008–09 season
She made her Junior Grand Prix debut at the 2008–09 ISU Junior Grand Prix event in Courchevel, France, the first event of the series. She placed 16th. Yun competed as a senior for the first time at the 2009 South Korean Championships and finished fourth overall with a score of 119.10. In the spring, she competed in the 2009 Triglav Trophy at the Junior level, and finished 6th.

2009–10 season
Yun was assigned to two events in the 2009–10 ISU Junior Grand Prix. At the event in Belarus, she placed 20th and earned personal bests scores in the short program, the free skate and the combined total. Those improved in the second Grand Prix event she competed in, set in Istanbul.

In January 2010, she competed in the 2010 South Korean Figure Skating Championships, where placed 9th overall scoring a total of 91.14 points after having problems with some of her jumps. However, she was selected to compete in the 2010 World Junior Figure Skating Championships, that were held in March 2010. She withdrew from the event.

2010–11 season
Yun competed at the 2011 South Korean Figure Skating Championships. Placing sixth in both the short program and the free skate, she placed sixth overall scoring 107.00 points. She was selected to compete at the 2011 Four Continents Figure Skating Championships.

Programs

Competitive highlights
JGP: Junior Grand Prix

Detailed results

References

External links

 
 Yun Yea-Ji at Tracings.net

South Korean female single skaters
Living people
1994 births
Figure skaters from Seoul